RhoGAP domain  is an evolutionary conserved protein domain of 
GTPase activating proteins towards Rho/Rac/Cdc42-like small GTPases.

Human proteins containing this domain 
ABR;       ARHGAP1;   ARHGAP10;  ARHGAP11A; ARHGAP11B; ARHGAP12;  ARHGAP15;  ARHGAP17;
ARHGAP18;  ARHGAP19;  ARHGAP20;  ARHGAP21;  ARHGAP22;  ARHGAP23;  ARHGAP24;  ARHGAP25;
ARHGAP26;  ARHGAP27;  ARHGAP28;  ARHGAP29;  ARHGAP30;  ARHGAP4;   ARHGAP5;   ARHGAP6;
ARHGAP8;   ARHGAP9;   BCR;       BPGAP1;    C1;        C5orf5;    CDGAP;     CENTD1;
CENTD2;    CENTD3;    CHN1;      CHN2;      DEPDC1;    DEPDC1A;   DEPDC1B;   DLC1;
FAM13A1;   FKSG42;    GMIP;      GRLF1;     HMHA1;     INPP5B;    KIAA1688;  LOC553158;
MYO9A;     MYO9B;     OCRL;      OPHN1;     PIK3R1;    PIK3R2;    PRR5;      RACGAP1;
RACGAP1P;  RALBP1;    RICH2;     RICS;      SH3BP1;    SLIT1;     SNX26;     SRGAP1;
SRGAP2;    SRGAP3;    STARD13;   STARD8;    SYDE1;     SYDE2;

Notes

References
  
 
 
 

Protein domains
Peripheral membrane proteins